The National Council for Drama Training (NCDT) was a partnership of employers in the theatre, broadcast and media industry, employee representatives and training providers from 1976 to 2012.

History
The National Council for Drama Training (NCDT) was established in 1976 following the publication of the Calouste Gulbenkian Foundation report 'Going on the Stage' into professional training for drama. NCDT has been supported by the performing arts industry and charged with maintaining standards at the nation's top drama schools. For many years NCDT has been providing assurance for students, their parents and funders that courses approved by NCDT are preparing students for careers in the drama profession. The council existed to act as a champion for the industry by working to optimise support for professional drama training and education, embracing change and development. Its primary role was to safeguard the highest standards and provides a credible process of quality assurance through accreditation for vocational drama courses in further and higher education in the UK. In 2012 they merged with the Conference of Drama Schools to form Drama UK.

See also
Acting
Actor
Drama school
Performing arts education

References

External links
 Official Website

Education in the London Borough of Camden
Higher education organisations based in the United Kingdom
Organisations based in the London Borough of Camden
Organizations established in 1976
Teacher associations based in the United Kingdom
Theatre in the United Kingdom
1976 establishments in the United Kingdom